Lise Cloquet (also known as Anne-Louise Cloquet; 1788 (Paris) –30 October 1860 (Paris)) was a French botanical painter. 

Cloquet was taught to draw by her father and was influenced by the botanical illustrator Pierre-Joseph Redouté.

32 of her works, including one of a white chrysanthemum, from 1820 are currently housed at the Oak Spring Garden Foundation in Upperville, Virginia.

Family 
Her father, Jean-Baptiste-Antoine Cloquet, was an illustrator and engraver. Her brother, Jules Cloquet, was a doctor.

References

External links 

1788 births
1860 deaths
French women artists
19th-century French illustrators
Botanical illustrators